Santuario de Nuestra Señora del Acebo is a church situated in Asturias, Spain.

The church was built around a chapel with a putatively miraculous image of the Virgin Mary, depicting Our Lady of Virtues.  It took only fifteen years to build since the first miracle (1575) took place; thus the sanctuary was completed in 1590.

Churches in Asturias
Roman Catholic churches completed in 1590
16th-century Roman Catholic church buildings in Spain